Jeromey Webberley is an Australian rules footballer who was drafted by Richmond in the fifth round of the 2009 AFL draft. He made his debut against Adelaide in round 7 of 2010 season. He was a success story of the new TSL, and was drafted because of his courageous efforts throughout the season and on grand final day kicked a miracle goal from 60m out to win Clarence the grand final against Glenorchy in 2009. Webberley was the winner of the 2009 RACT insurance player of the year.

After the completion of the 2012 season Richmond officially announced Webberley's delisting from its senior list.

In 2016 Webberley was appointed coach of the Clarence Football Club after the resignation of Trent Bartlett.

At the end of the 2021 season moved into the role of Tasmania Devils coach in the NAB League Boys and NAB League Girls competitions.

References

External links

1988 births
Living people
Richmond Football Club players
Coburg Football Club players
Australian rules footballers from Tasmania
Clarence Football Club players
Clarence Football Club coaches